Mission San Ignacio Kadakaaman was founded by the Jesuit missionary Juan Bautista de Luyando in 1728 at the site of the modern town of San Ignacio, Baja California Sur, Mexico.

History
The site for the future mission was discovered in 1706 by Francisco María Piccolo at the palm-lined Cochimí oasis of Kadakaamán ("arroyo of the reeds"). The site proved to be a highly productive one agriculturally, and served as the base for later Jesuit expansion in the central peninsula. The impressive surviving church was constructed by the Dominican missionary Juan Gómez in 1786. The mission was finally abandoned in 1840.

A statue of St. Martin de Porres, ‘saint of the broom’ adorns the sanctuary wall.

See also

 Spanish missions in Baja California
 Spanish missions in California
 Ferdinand Konščak
 List of Jesuit sites

References
 Vernon, Edward W. 2002. Las Misiones Antiguas: The Spanish Missions of Baja California, 1683–1855. Viejo Press, Santa Barbara, California.

San Ignacio
Mulegé Municipality
Roman Catholic churches completed in 1728
1728 establishments in New Spain
1728 in New Spain
18th-century Roman Catholic church buildings in Mexico